Wohlfahrtiimonas larvae is a Gram-negative, facultatively anaerobic and motile bacterium from the genus of Wohlfahrtiimonas which has been isolated from the gut of the larva Hermetia illucens.

References

Gammaproteobacteria
Bacteria described in 2014